The 2021–22 Macedonian Football Cup was the 30th season of North Macedonia's football knockout competition. Sileks were the defending champions, having won their third title in the previous year.

Competition calendar

First round
Matches were played on 15 and 22 September 2021.

|colspan="3" style="background-color:#97DEFF" align=center|15 September 2021

|-
|colspan="3" style="background-color:#97DEFF" align=center|22 September 2021

|-
|colspan="3" style="background-color:#97DEFF" align=center|N/A

Second round
The draw was held on 28 September 2021.

|colspan="3" style="background-color:#97DEFF" align=center|20 October 2021

Quarter-finals
The draw was held on 2 November 2021.

|colspan="3" style="background-color:#97DEFF" align=center|1 December 2021

|-
|colspan="3" style="background-color:#97DEFF" align=center|15 December 2021

Semi-finals

Summary
|colspan="3" style="background-color:#97DEFF" align=center|20 April 2022

Matches

Final

See also 
 2021–22 Macedonian First Football League
 2021–22 Macedonian Second Football League

References

External links 
Football Federation of Macedonia 
MacedonianFootball.com 

North Macedonia
Cup
Macedonian Football Cup seasons